Mount Slamet  or Gunung Slamet is an active stratovolcano in the Purbalingga Regency of Central Java, Indonesia. It has a cluster of around three dozen cinder cones on the lower southeast-northeast flanks and a single cinder cone on the western flank. The volcano is composed of two overlapping edifices. Four craters are found at the summit. 

Historical eruptions have been recorded since the eighteenth century., with its most recent events being in 2009 and 2014. Its summit is Central Java's highest point.

Eruptions

September 2014 
Mount Slamet erupted again Wednesday, September 18, 2014 after four years of remaining quiet. The volcano, dormant since 2009, began erupting again in late August 2014 prompting authorities to raise alert levels in the area. While the eruption was not considered to be a large one, a nearby forest was razed and authorities have blocked off a 2.5 mile radius in case of increased activity. Residents have otherwise remained calm in the region.Based on the identity found, the victim named Sumardi 47 years from Giyanti Village, Candimulyo District, Magelang.

From the results of the examination conducted by the medical team, the victim died due to hypothermia.

See also 

 List of volcanoes in Indonesia
 Volcanological Survey of Indonesia
 List of Ultras of Malay Archipelago

References

Further reading
 Slamet: Global Volcanism Program - Smithsonian Institution
  Soegiyanto.Anugerah Gunung Slamet  Jakarta : Balai Pustaka, 1995. Cet. 4. 
 "Gunung Slamet, Indonesia" on Peakbagger.com

Active volcanoes of Indonesia
Stratovolcanoes of Indonesia
Volcanoes of Central Java
Mountains of Central Java
Articles containing video clips
Holocene stratovolcanoes